The Oil Depletion Analysis Centre (ODAC) is an independent, UK-registered educational charity. The centre is working to raise international public awareness and promote better understanding of the world's oil depletion and peak oil problem.  It is based in London and belongs to the New Economics Foundation.

ODAC was founded in June 2001 on the belief that an informed public debate about the likely impacts of depleting oil supplies is critically needed. A growing number of experts now predict that world oil production has peaked or will reach its physical peak within the coming decade and then start to permanently decline. The prevailing view of most energy policy-makers and institutions is that near-term oil supply is mainly an economic and geopolitical concern. Under almost any scenario, however, lead time is running short for a smooth transition to new energy systems and a less oil-dependent way of life.

On 30 March 2012, the activities of the Oil Depletion Analysis Centre (ODAC) were taken over by its parent organisation, the New Economics Foundation (NEF).

History
The organisation was founded by Sarah Astor and Dr. Colin Campbell.  In his book Oil Crisis Campbell explains that the Astor family wanted to establish and provide funds for an institute to raise awareness on this issue of oil depletion and peak oil. The first director was Dr. Roger Bentley.

In 2004, ODAC sponsored Chris Skrebowski's report, called "Oil Field Megaprojects", which analysed data from 68 oil production projects.

In November 2005, ODAC published a report after conducting a survey led by Chris Skrebowski, which concluded that oil supply will not meet demand by 2007 or 2008.

In June 2007, a report authored by Colin Campbell predicted that peak oil would occur within four years.

David Strahan is an investigative journalist and documentary filmmaker, with many years experience of popularising some of the most difficult and important stories in business and science. He quit the BBC to spend two years researching and writing The Last Oil Shock: A Survival Guide to the Imminent Extinction of Petroleum Man, published by John Murray in April 2007 (pbk ).

References

External links
 ODAC Information site

Peak oil
Petroleum in the United Kingdom
Educational charities based in the United Kingdom
Organizations established in 2001
2001 establishments in the United Kingdom